The Shocker (Herman Schultz) is a supervillain appearing in American comic books published by Marvel Comics. Created by Stan Lee and John Romita Sr, the character debuted in The Amazing Spider-Man #46 in March 1967. He is usually depicted as an enemy of the superhero Spider-Man, and belongs to the collective of adversaries that make up his rogues gallery.

In the comics, Herman Schultz was originally a self-taught engineer and renowned safe cracker who invented a pair of gauntlets capable of producing powerful vibrational shock waves. He incorporated these gauntlets into a protective battlesuit and became a mercenary for hire. As the Shocker, Schultz quickly rose in New York City's criminal underworld and has been employed by various crime lords, which has often put him into conflict with Spider-Man. One notable trait that differentiates the Shocker from most other Spider-Man villains is his pursuit of wealth and a comfortable life rather than revenge or chaos. As a result, the Shocker has sometimes put aside his differences with Spider-Man and has helped him or other heroes when it was in his best interest.
	
The character was ranked as Spider-Man's 23rd greatest enemy by IGN. The Shocker has been adapted from the comics into various forms of media, having been voiced by Jim Cummings in Spider-Man: The Animated Series, Jeff Bennett in The Spectacular Spider-Man, and David B. Mitchell in the video game Spider-Man. Two iterations of the character were featured in the 2017 Marvel Cinematic Universe film Spider-Man: Homecoming, with Herman Schultz portrayed by Bokeem Woodbine and Jackson Brice portrayed by Logan Marshall-Green.

Publication history

The character first appeared in The Amazing Spider-Man #46 (March 1967) and was created by Stan Lee and John Romita Sr.

In an interview, Romita discussed how he designed the character, "I used a lot of very subliminal feeling. While designing the Shocker costume, for some reason, I thought 'cushion' and 'quilt.' I'm thinking, if the guy has a shocking power and vibrates buildings so they fell apart by shaking them, then there's got to be some kind of cushion effect, and so, subliminally, I did it."

He appeared as a regular character in Thunderbolts from issue #157 to 162, when he deserted the team. He was also one of the main characters in "The Superior Foes of Spider-Man" comic series.

Fictional character biography
Herman Schultz was born in New York City. He was a high school dropout who had brilliant talents as both an inventor and an engineer. Instead of using such talents to gain legitimate employment, he became a successful burglar and the world's best safe-cracker (according to him in later stories). After finally being caught and incarcerated for his crimes, he developed a pair of gauntlets designed to shoot air blasts, vibrating at high frequency. Schultz uses his gauntlets to escape from prison and becomes the supervillain known as "the Shocker". He defeats Spider-Man in their first confrontation (Spider-Man was at a disadvantage due to having a bad left arm sprain from an earlier battle with the Lizard) during a robbery. While robbing a bank, he was later beaten and sent back to prison after Spider-Man pinned Schultz's thumbs away from the gauntlets' triggers with his webbing and then knocked him out.

Shocker later stole an ancient stone tablet with an inscription for a formula that could restore youth, that had been earlier stolen by the Kingpin. Likely Schultz's most ambitious solo exploit was his attempt to hold New York City for ransom by blacking out various electrical grids to spell out his name, and extort one million dollars from the city. He then made one million dollars by harassing a stock broker. Shocker later joined Egghead's Masters of Evil (with Radioactive Man, Tiger Shark, Moonstone, and Beetle) to incriminate Dr. Henry Pym, then on trial for treason. The Masters battled the Avengers in this encounter; Shocker was brainwashed and purposely abandoned by Egghead to deliver a false testimony, and subsequently cooperated with the authorities in exonerating the ex-Avenger. Shocker was later hired by the Nazi war criminal Baron Von Lundt to kill Dominic Fortune, and built the vibro-shock units into his entire uniform to do so. Shocker was hired by the Chameleon and Hammerhead to induce Electro to join their organization. Shocker later attempted to steal thousands of charity dollars at the celebrity fund raiser for the New York City Library. He's captured by Spider-Man and sent to prison. He later escapes with the help of fellow inmate Boomerang. By this time, he's developed severe confidence issues and has become terrified that the Scourge of the Underworld is going to kill him. A tipping point occurs when Spider-Man apprehends him and seems to not take him seriously. Enraged, Shocker defeats Spider-Man and is about to finish him off when a Scourge imposter intervenes, causing Shocker to flee. When he next appeared his confidence issues are gone. He aims to hunt down Scourge himself and kill him first.

Shocker has proven to be a constant presence among Spider-Man's gallery of enemies. He often works as a member of a team (including Hobgoblin's Sinister Seven, Norman Osborn's Sinister Twelve, Doctor Octopus's most recent Sinister Six, and the Masters of Evil) or in partnership with at least one other villain. Previous alliances include Boomerang, the Beetle, Rhino, Leila Davis, Hydro-Man, and Speed Demon (all of which made up the Sinister Syndicate), and the Trapster, Constrictor and Jack O'Lantern. He also teamed up with a large group of villains during the Acts of Vengeance, when he helped them unsuccessfully attack the Fantastic Four. During one of his team-ups with Doctor Octopus, he participated in a raid on Avengers Mansion, hoping to help conquer it as the heroes were distracted by the events of the Infinity War. Shocker was forced to fight alongside the heroes called the Guardians of the Galaxy when alien doubles of both sides attacked. After the doubles stopped coming, Doctor Octopus tried to order Shocker and the others to continue fighting the heroes but instead, they turned on Doctor Octopus. They did not wish to harm the people who had helped save their lives. Shocker helped chase Doctor Octopus out of the building.

At one point in his career, Shocker became increasingly paranoid that he was on the Scourge of the Underworld's hit list, even though there was no actual proof that he was. He thus started seeking ways to become more powerful, hoping to thwart any attempt on his life by the vigilante group. Shocker somehow acquired actual superhuman vibration powers. As he becomes more powerful, he realizes that the new powers will eventually kill him. He seeks a vibrational harness to cure himself and is aided by Night Thrasher and Spider-Man. Shocker has had Spider-Man on the ropes on several occasions, with timely interventions often saving Spider-Man. Individuals thwarting Shocker's victories over Spider-Man include security guards, Dominic Fortune, and even a Scourge of the Underworld impostor. Shocker has also let Spider-Man go on a few occasions, the first being when he found Spider-Man incapacitated with a bout of vertigo on the outside of a tall building. He doesn't kill Spider-Man, thinking it an unworthy end, but doesn't help him either. Shocker found another moment of victory over Spider-Man when he teamed up with the Trapster. Sent by the Friends of Humanity to assassinate Paul Stacy, the duo managed to glue Stacy and Spider-Man together and corner them, only to be called off their assignment moments before finishing them off. Shocker would later turn on the Trapster at the behest of Osborn of having Trapster eliminated as a potential witness against his recent attempt to frame Spider-Man for murder. Preparing to kill the resigned Trapster in an alley, he was attacked and rendered unconscious at the last minute by Spider-Man (then disguised under the alias Dusk).

Shocker has a run-in with Iron Man on a subway car in NYC. Shocker is hired by the Golem, along with Constrictor and Jack O'Lantern, to protect a diamond delivery. He battles Hood. Shocker was terminated as a freelance agent by Hammer Industries and captured by Spider-Man while trying to rob a federal bank alongside Hydro-Man. He accidentally evaporates his water-based ally with a misplaced vibration. He allied himself with Speed Demon of the New Thunderbolts to break into a particularly well-guarded safe. Though the police arrived at his hide-out in quick pursuit, he was saved by Speed Demon dashing in and stealing both the loot and Shocker's weapons, removing all traces of evidence (and, unfortunately for Shocker, also keeping the money to fund the Thunderbolts' further activities).

Shocker plays a small role in the "Secret War" crossover event where he was among the villains used by Lucia von Bardas to attack New York.

A new version of the Sinister Six, with Shocker as a member, bands together during the "Civil War" but were stopped by Captain America and his Secret Avengers.

Shocker was among the group of villains that the Punisher attempts to kill at the wake of the recently deceased Stilt-Man that was held at the Bar with No Name. He survives the poisoning and fire-bombing.

Shocker was shown to have partially reformed the Sinister Syndicate alongside Hydro-Man and Boomerang. This group attempts to rob Baily's Auction House but are interrupted by Spider-Man and then Initiative members War Machine and Komodo. The latter are there to neutralize Spider-Man. The trio escapes, only to be found and attacked by government operatives called 'Scarlet Spiders'.

In his first "Brand New Day" appearance, he is shown to have been hired by a mobster to take out a subway train wagon full of jurors. After a brief battle with Spider-Man, he is knocked unconscious while Spider-Man uses his gauntlets to destroy rubble blocking the path. Although he seems cooperative at first, as soon as he is secured by Spider-Man, he activates a powerful shock in his gauntlets through his belt, causing the main exit to collapse and allowing him to escape. On their way to collect money from bets on superhero fights, Shocker and Boomerang discover the dead body of "the Bookie".

During the "Dark Reign" storyline, Shocker appeared as a member of Hood's crime syndicate.

During the Origin of the Species storyline, Shocker is invited by Doctor Octopus to rejoin the reestablished Sinister Six, where he exchange for securing some specific items. He and Tombstone went after Menace's infant in the restaurant shop, until Spider-Man interfered. After he passes out from his fight, the police arrive but Shocker is carried away by Tombstone who escapes. When Spider-Man goes on a rampage against the villains after the infant was stolen by Chameleon, Shocker is attacked in his hideout and threatens Shocker to tell him everything about the villains' whereabouts. Shocker tells Spider-Man that Chameleon has the baby at the Kravinoff Mansion.

Shocker was then seen in the Raft due to a popular online vote at Marvel.com and was selected to join the Thunderbolts's new Beta team called the Underbolts where it was revealed that MACH-V has put his name on the list of likely candidates.

During the "Spider-Island" storyline, Spider-Man and Carlie Cooper encounter a six-armed Shocker. During the fight, Shocker reveals that he wants the money so that Mad Thinker can cure him. Shocker then pulls off his mask to reveal that he's slowly mutating into a spider-like creature.

Shocker later appeared as a member of Villains for Hire (a villain counterpart of Heroes for Hire).

As part of the "Marvel NOW!", Shocker appears as a member of the latest incarnation of the Sinister Six, consisting of himself, Boomerang, Lady Beetle, Speed Demon, Overdrive, and the Living Brain.

Shocker features as one of the main characters in The Superior Foes of Spider-Man, which concludes with Silvermane crowning him the new don of the New York underworld after Shocker saves dozens of mobsters by singlehandedly defeating the Punisher. Shocker shares a meal with She-Hulk while they discuss a memory Jennifer cannot remember, and Herman helps her by telling what little he remembers because she treated him well and bought him lunch, whereas other heroes would just beat him up and ask questions later. It was then revealed that a villain named Nighteater created a spell that would murder hundreds of people but made everyone think he was not a villain, but was instead a hero named Nightwatch, because it was more profitable. When Shocker found out, he assisted She-Hulk in defeating Nightwatch. When asked by Nightwatch why Shocker was angry after already getting his cut, even if he had forgotten, Shocker said that it was because he wanted to be a hero too.

When New York City was covered in the Darkforce dome by the evil Captain America during the "Secret Empire" storyline, Shocker and Scorpia took advantage of this by robbing a bank but was stopped by Rogue. When the Shocker accidentally crushes the ground beneath them, they were surrounded by Darkforce creatures and had no choice but to work together. When they finally beat the biggest of the creatures, Rogue flies away. Herman Schultz is being tried for his crimes as the Shocker and Rogue volunteers herself as a character witness. Rogue said that the Shocker, from her experience when she was fighting Darkforce monsters alongside him, was smart, kind and courageous, and given the chance, could redeem himself.

During the "Sinister War" storyline, Shocker was with Boomerang, Hydro-Man, Speed Demon, and Overdrive when they were used by Kindred to attack Spider-Man.

During the "Devil's Reign" storyline, Shocker was seen as a member of Mayor Wilson Fisk's incarnation of the Thunderbolts at the time when Mayor Fisk made superhero activities illegal. After defeating Darkhawk, Shocker tried to get Luke Cage and Jessica Jones to surrender only to be defeated by them.

Characterization

Skills and equipment
The Shocker wears a pair of gauntlets he designed with vibro-shock units known as "vibro-smashers" that, when activated by a pump-action thumb trigger, can project a concentrated blast of compressed air that vibrates at an intense frequency. This creates a series of rapid-succession high-pressure air blasts that result in a series of powerful impacts. This allows Shocker to both effectively throw long range vibrational punches from a distance, creating destructive vibrations that can crumble solid concrete and cause extensive damage to the human body and its internal organs, as well as throw shock waves which vibrate the structure of something to weaken or destroy it. A lesser known ability of the gauntlets allows Shocker to make incredible leaps, by directing the air blasts toward the ground in front of him. Holding the thumb triggers down for an extended period of time increases the intensity, speed, and even spread of the air blasts.

The feedback from the Shocker's gauntlets is extremely intense (the initial test almost killed him). To guard himself from this, he developed a protective costume consisting largely of yellow quilt patches designed to absorb the shock. The costume is made of foam-lined synthetic fabric which absorbs all vibrations and establishes a vibrational shield which deflects normal blows and allows him to slip from any grasp. The costume's appearance has been the source of ridicule on the part of Spider-Man and other characters. How fellow villain the Looter was able to once wield one of the gauntlets without wearing a protective costume and suffering injury is unclear, though his super strength and durability were presumably a factor. Despite having no superhuman abilities, his vibrating suit and gauntlets enable him to trade blows with Spider-Man.

Around the year 2000 (real time), Herman Schultz began upgrading the abilities of his costume and weapons. His suit now contains a number of built-in shock units, which throw up a protective vibrational field when triggered by accompanying motion detectors. Besides deflecting most physical blows, this makes it difficult, if not impossible for someone to physically assault or grasp him by surprise. This power upgrade was accompanied by a much bulkier and more protective looking costume (as designed by artist John Romita, Jr.).

He also recently allowed Hammer Industries to drastically upgrade the power of his gauntlets. However, not trusting to share the whole of his secrets (and thus become what he perceives as expendable), he refused Hammer's technicians access to his actual costume, which (at least at the time) likely wasn't providing him with thorough protection from the feedback of the upgraded gauntlets (he cited nosebleeds as a risk he was willing to take).

Shocker has since appeared repeatedly in his original costume and minus the redesigned super-gauntlets provided to him by Hammer Industries. Whether or not this means he has found a way to retain his upgraded abilities in his old costume or whether he no longer uses them remains in question.

Continued use of the gauntlets has had a negative effect on Shocker's body, and he admits that he rarely has a day when he gets out of bed without his back hurting.

Personality
While most Spider-Man villains usually shift from their original goals to a vendetta against Spider-Man, the Shocker is still concerned largely with making a living and protecting his reputation. As such, the character is usually portrayed as behaving in a more professional manner than the majority of his maniacal peers.

Shocker has a notably rational personality among Spider-Man's enemies. He has often been shown to recognize his own limitations amongst a universe of super-powered individuals. He was once stricken with chronic anxiety and paranoia (in the Deadly Foes of Spider-Man series) stemming from his fears about being targeted by anti-heroes Scourge and the Punisher (surprisingly, he has survived encounters with both). While partnered with the Trapster, he mentions that he engages in psychotherapy.

In recent stories ("Venomous" and "Senseless Violence"), Shocker has revealed that he is extremely frustrated with his place in life, not wanting to be known as a punching bag for superheroes like Spider-Man. He unsuccessfully attempts to purchase the Venom symbiote at an auction to gain some respect. When temporarily partnered with Hydro-Man, he rebukes Morrie's suggestion that they go kill Spider-Man, being far more interested in more financially lucrative ventures and trying to rebuild a professional reputation.

Other characters named Shocker

Dalt Kendall
Dalt Kendall was a brilliant scientist who was obsessed with electric eels. He began breeding a pair of gigantic electric eels in his secret lab, slowly exposing himself to their electricity. Over time his body developed an immunity to electricity and the ability to discharge electricity at will. Using his new powers, he began a life of crime, calling himself the Shocker. Madeline Joyce witnessed his first robbery and in her costumed identity of Miss America, attempted to apprehend the Shocker. Shocker managed to evade capture several times before Miss America finally discovered the entrance to his secret lab. Once he discovered she was in his hideout, Shocker began to divulge the source of his powers before taking the opportunity to attack the heroine. Miss America then tricked him into thinking she was unconscious and struck back at him, punching him into his pet eel aquarium. Somehow, the eel's electricity killed him while unconscious even though he had the ability to harmlessly absorb their electricity otherwise.

Randall Darby

Randall Darby is a mutant who took the Shocker codename after being recruited by Magneto to become a member of his Brotherhood of Mutants, but after Magneto abandoned him, Darby changes his code name to Paralyzer.

Reception
 In 2020, CBR.com ranked Shocker 6th in their "10 Most Powerful Members of the Sinister Syndicate" list.

Other versions

Amazing Spider-Man: Renew Your Vows
During the "Secret Wars" storyline in the pages of Amazing Spider-Man: Renew Your Vows, Shocker appears as an enforcer of Regent where he is seen assisting Boomerang and Rhino in beating up Demolition Man. He later appears as a member of the Sinister Six when they are tasked to hunt down Spider-Man.

JLA/Avengers
In JLA/Avengers, the Shocker is among the mind-controlled villains who attack the heroes as they assault Krona's stronghold. He is defeated by the Flash.

Ultimate Marvel
The Ultimate Marvel incarnation of Shocker is 33-year-old petty crook Herman Schultz who raids money transports. He wears a purple trench coat and a pair of goggles to protect his eyes. He used to work at Roxxon Industries and invented his weapons there. He was fired later and then became the Shocker to "get what he deserves" for all the work he has done. He is not especially dangerous and has fought Spider-Man five times in the first 100 issues. During several, there was an unusual factor: Spider-Man wearing the black suit, or the presence of Kitty Pryde, or Wolverine putting Shocker at a disadvantage. Ultimately, he suffers five embarrassing defeats. Thus, he perpetually ends up in jail and his equipment is confiscated. However, he somehow manages to get a new set every time he escapes. It was shown in Ultimate Marvel Team-Up that he does make new vibration units in the machine shop of the prison. It is also implied that he isn't always charged with anything; Spider-Man simply leaves him at the crime scene. This was noted in their encounter in the second annual when Foggy Nelson advised Spider-Man to hand him over to the police rather than leave him on the ground. He is seen in the annual being dropped off at a police station while crying. He gets some measure of revenge, where he unexpectedly defeats, captures, and tortures Spider-Man, and relays his background. He studied at MIT vigorously and eventually secured a job at Roxxon Industries creating high-end weaponry before being cheated out of his work and earnings. With Spider-Man as his only outlet for rage, he proceeds to assault him before once again being arrested by the authorities led by NYPD's Captain Frank Quaid after a tip from Kitty and Mary Jane Watson.

What If
The Shocker has appeared in two different What If stories:
 In "What If... The Punisher Had Killed Spider-Man?", Shocker is among the group of Spider-Man's enemies who welcomed the Punisher with a toast for killing the hero. Instead of accepting the toast, Punisher killed all the villains present. 
 In "What If Scarlet Witch Ended the House of M event by saying No More Powers?", after the Scarlet Witch removed all non-tech based superpowers, Shocker, along with M.O.D.O.K., Vulture, Stilt-Man and Trapster, broke into Kronos Building to steal the Cosmic Cube from Aleksander Lukin, but he was not present; in his place was the Winter Soldier, who attacked the group. After a short battle, Iron Man arrived and defeated the group.

Old Man Logan
On Earth-807128, the Shocker was one of the villains who seemingly became organized and attacked the X-Mansion as a group. Logan fought and killed all of villains before finding out that it was all an illusion cast by Mysterio and that he was actually killing his fellow X-Men.

In the pages of Old Man Logan which takes place on Earth-21923, Mysterio's use of the Shocker illusion remains intact In the pages of Avengers of the Wastelands, Shocker was among the villains that attack Danielle Cage's group in Osborn County where they were killed by the insects summoned by Dwight Barrett's Ant-Man helmet.

Marvel Universe Vs. The Punisher
In Marvel Universe Vs. The Punisher, when a plague turned the world's population into cannibals, the Shocker was one of the many supervillains that succumbed to it. He fought alongside the Hulk's army when they confronted the escaping heroes and scientists on the Goethals Bridge, but was decapitated in the ensuing battle. Shocker is later seen among the Punisher's collection of severed heads.

Marvel Zombies
During the "Secret Wars" storyline in the Battleworld domain of Deadlands (based from the remnants of Earth-2149), Shocker is one of the zombies who attacked the strike force that Crossbones had assembled to hunt down the Red Skull.

Spider-Geddon
During the Spider-Geddon storyline, Earth-91053 featured a female version of Shocker named Anita Dillon, who is the mother of Max Dillon. Shocker breaks into the Brand Corporation in search of her son and takes several hostages, but is taken down by The Spider and arrested by the NYPD.

Marvel Noir
In the Marvel Noir universe, Herman Schultz is an American citizen who owns his own company, called Schultz Enterprises. In 1940, during World War II, Schultz secretly allied with the Nazis, building for them a battle suit capable of firing powerful shock waves, which, according to Schultz, would help them "end the war in a month". In the middle of a meeting between him and some Nazi officers, Spider-Man Noir and the White Widow, in an attempt to prevent Schultz from selling the suit, confront him and they manage to disable it after a brief fight.

Wasteland Avengers
The Shocker is part of a small group of supervillains who survived for decades after America was conquered and laid to waste. This group comes between a war between the new Avengers and Doctor Doom, but do not survive.

In other media

Television
 The Herman Schultz incarnation of Shocker appears in the Spider-Man and His Amazing Friends episode "Along Came a Spidey", voiced by John Stephenson.
 The Herman Schultz incarnation of Shocker appears in Spider-Man (1994), voiced by Jim Cummings. This version is a member of Kingpin's Insidious Six whose gauntlets fire electricity rather than compressed air.
 A variation of Shocker appears in The Spectacular Spider-Man as the alter-ego of Jackson "Montana" Brice, voiced by Jeff Bennett. This change was made because series producer Greg Weisman believed Montana is more interesting and menacing than Herman Schultz.
 The Herman Schultz incarnation of Shocker appears in Ultimate Spider-Man, voiced by Troy Baker.
 Herman Schultz appears in the Spider-Man (2017) episode "Osborn Academy", voiced by Cameron Boyce. This version is a teenager who specializes in vibration technology and best friend of Clayton Cole.

Film
The Herman Schultz incarnation of Shocker appears in Spider-Man: Homecoming, portrayed by Bokeem Woodbine. This version is an employee of Adrian Toomes' salvaging company before it went out of business following the Department of Damage Control being established and the group turned to crime. Additionally, Schultz is the second individual to use the Shocker alias after Toomes accidentally kills the first, Jackson Brice (portrayed by Logan Marshall-Green), and wields a modified version of Crossbones' vibro-blast emitting gauntlet. Schultz assists Toomes in his criminal operations until he is defeated by Spider-Man and arrested by the authorities.

Video games
 Android replicas of Shocker appear as mini-bosses in the Spider-Man levels of Spider-Man/X-Men: Arcade's Revenge.
 The Herman Schultz incarnation of Shocker appears as a mini-boss in Spider-Man (1995).
 The Herman Schultz incarnation of Shocker appears in the interactive DOS game Spider-Man: The Sinister Six as a member of the titular team.
 The Herman Schultz incarnation of Shocker appears as the first boss of Spider-Man 2: Enter Electro, voiced by Daran Norris. This version is an underling of Electro.
 The Herman Schultz incarnation of Shocker appears in Spider-Man (2002), voiced by Michael Beattie.
 The Herman Schultz incarnation of Shocker appears in Spider-Man 2 (2004), voiced again by Michael Beattie. This version's gauntlets produce electricity instead of shockwaves.
 The Ultimate Marvel version of Herman Schultz / Shocker appears as a boss in the Ultimate Spider-Man video game, voiced by Brian George.
 The Herman Schultz incarnation of Shocker appears as a mini-boss in Marvel: Ultimate Alliance, voiced by Michael Gough. This version is a member of Doctor Doom's Masters of Evil.
 The Herman Schultz incarnation of Shocker appears as a boss and later a possible assist character in the PSP and PS2 versions of Spider-Man: Web of Shadows, voiced by Liam O'Brien. To halt a symbiote invasion, Spider-Man seeks out Shocker for his gauntlets to construct a sonic emitter. After being defeated by Spider-Man, Shocker gives the web-slinger his gauntlets and urges the hero not to turn him in. Depending on the player's choice, Spider-Man can either turn Shocker over to the police or trust him and let him go. If the latter choice is made, Shocker becomes an ally to Spider-Man.
 The Herman Schultz incarnation of Shocker appears as a mini-boss in the next-gen versions of Marvel: Ultimate Alliance 2, voiced by Rick D. Wasserman.
 The Herman Schultz incarnation of Shocker appears in the Nintendo DS version of Spider-Man: Edge of Time, voiced by Steve Blum. He fights Spider-Man 2099 for possession of a fragment of the Tablet of Order and Chaos.
 The Herman Schultz incarnation of Shocker appears in Marvel Heroes, voiced by David Boat.
 The Herman Schultz incarnation of Shocker appears as a playable character in Lego Marvel Super Heroes, voiced by Greg Cipes.
 The Herman Schultz incarnation of Shocker appears as a boss, later playable character, in Marvel: Avengers Alliance.
 The Herman Schultz incarnation of Shocker appears as the first boss in The Amazing Spider-Man 2, voiced by Ryan Alosio. This version is initially a low-level gang boss and arms dealer who Spider-Man defeats and interrogates for Dennis Carradine's whereabouts. Schultz later attacks Oscorp to steal construction equipment called the "Seismic Harness Construction Resource" to win a gang war and dubs himself the "Shocker", only to be defeated by Spider-Man and left for the police.
 The Herman Schultz incarnation of Shocker appears as a mini-boss in Marvel: Avengers Alliance 2.
 The Herman Schultz incarnation of Shocker appears as a playable character and boss in Lego Marvel Super Heroes 2. Additionally, the 'Spider-Man: Homecoming incarnation is also playable and serves as a mini-boss in the game's open world.
 The Herman Schultz incarnation of Shocker appears in Marvel Strike Force as a member of the Sinister Six.
 The Herman Schultz incarnation of Shocker appears as a boss in Marvel's Spider-Man, voiced by Dave B. Mitchell. This version sports a more modern look and can use his gauntlets to jump great lengths. Within the game's continuity, Spider-Man has been a hero for eight years and is well-familiar with Shocker, having fought him multiple times in the past. In the character's biography, Spider-Man refers to him as his first real "super" adversary, and the least psychotic one, as Shocker usually avoids civilian casualties and only engages in illegal activities to make a living. During the game's story, Shocker is released from Ryker's Island on parole, but runs afoul of Mister Negative's gang, who force him to commit bank robberies to finance their crimes. He has two encounters with Spider-Man, both of which end with his defeat and re-incarceration.

References

External links
 Shocker at Marvel.com

Characters created by John Romita Sr.
Characters created by Stan Lee
Comics characters introduced in 1967
Fictional characters from New York City
Fictional engineers
Fictional inventors
Marvel Comics supervillains
Spider-Man characters
Superhero film characters